Androlepis skinneri is a plant species native to southern Mexico (Veracruz, Chiapas, Tabasco) and Central America (Belize, Guatemala, Honduras, Nicaragua). This is one of the few Bromelioideae species that is dioecious.

Cultivars
 × Androlaechmea 'Crateriformis'
 × Androlaechmea 'Cyclops'
 × Androlaechmea 'Dean'
 × Androlaechmea 'O'Rourke'
 × Androlaechmea 'Sampson'

References

skinneri
Flora of Mexico
Flora of Central America
Plants described in 1861
Epiphytes
Dioecious plants